Thunder Below is a 1932 American pre-Code drama film directed by Richard Wallace, written by Sidney Buchman and Josephine Lovett, and starring Tallulah Bankhead, Charles Bickford, Paul Lukas, Eugene Pallette, Ralph Forbes and Leslie Fenton. It was released on June 17, 1932, by Paramount Pictures.

Bankhead later said "For all Wallace’s divinity, for all my vitality, Thunder Below was a double-jointed dud, maudlin and messy."

Cast 
Tallulah Bankhead as Susan
Charles Bickford as Walt
Paul Lukas as Ken
Eugene Pallette as Bill Horner
Ralph Forbes as Davis
Leslie Fenton as Webb
James Finlayson as Scotty
Mona Rico as Pajarita (uncredited)

References

External links
 

1932 films
American drama films
1932 drama films
Paramount Pictures films
Films directed by Richard Wallace
Films with screenplays by Sidney Buchman
American black-and-white films
1930s English-language films
1930s American films